John Chiles Houk (February 26, 1860 – June 3, 1923) was an American politician and a member of the United States House of Representatives for the 2nd congressional district of Tennessee.

Biography
Houk was born in Clinton, Tennessee in Anderson County on February 26, 1860, son of Leonidas C. Houk and Elizabeth Houk.  He attended the local schools, and moved with his parents to Knoxville in 1871. He graduated from the University of Tennessee at Knoxville.

Career
Employed as a clerk in the Pensions Bureau at Washington, D.C., Houk worked from 1881 to 1883. He studied law at Columbian (now George Washington) University in Washington, D.C. He was admitted to the bar in 1884, and he commenced practice in Knoxville.

Houk was a secretary of the state Republican committee for four years. He was Assistant Doorkeeper of the House of Representatives in the Fifty-first Congress.

Elected as a Republican to the Fifty-second Congress to fill the vacancy caused by the death of his father, Leonidas C. Houk, Houk was re-elected to the Fifty-third Congress and served from December 7, 1891 to March 3, 1895.  He was an unsuccessful candidate for renomination in 1894.

Houk served in the Tennessee Senate from 1897 to 1899, from 1911 to 1913, and from 1917 to 1923. He resumed the practice of law in Knoxville, Tennessee.

Death
Houk died in Fountain City, Tennessee in Knox County on June 3, 1923 (age 63 years, 97 days). He is interred at Greenwood Cemetery in Knoxville, Tennessee.

References

External links

1860 births
1923 deaths
Republican Party Tennessee state senators
Republican Party members of the United States House of Representatives from Tennessee
People from Clinton, Tennessee
People from Knoxville, Tennessee